The CEV Cup is the second tier official competition for men's Volleyball clubs of Europe. The competition takes place every year.

Until 2000, it was the CEV Cup Winners' Cup. In 2000 it was renamed CEV Top Teams Cup and in 2007 it was renamed CEV Cup. The former CEV Cup was renamed to CEV Challenge Cup.

History
 CEV Cup Winners' Cup (1972–73 to 1999–2000)
 CEV Top Teams Cup (2000–01 to 2006–2007)
 CEV Cup (2007–08 to present)

Title holders

 1972–73:  Zvezda Voroshilovgrad
 1973–74:  Elektrotechnika Riga
 1974–75:  Elektrotechnika Riga
 1975–76:  CSKA Sofia
 1976–77:  Elektrotechnika Riga
 1977–78:  Rudá Hvězda Praha
 1978–79:  Dinamo București
 1979–80:  Panini Modena
 1980–81:  Červená Hvězda Bratislava
 1981–82:  Avtomobilist Leningrad
 1982–83:  Avtomobilist Leningrad
 1983–84:  Robe di Kappa Torino
 1984–85:  Dynamo Moscow 
 1985–86:  Panini Modena
 1986–87:  Tartarini Bologna
 1987–88:  Maxicono Parma
 1988–89:  Maxicono Parma

 1989–90:  Maxicono Parma
 1990–91:  Eurostile Montichari
 1991–92:  Eurostile Montichari
 1992–93:  Mediolanum Milano
 1993–94:  Sisley Treviso 
 1994–95:  Daytona Las Modena
 1995–96:  Olympiacos Piraeus
 1996–97:  Alpitour Traco Cuneo
 1997–98:  Alpitour Traco Cuneo
 1998–99:  AS Cannes
 1999–00:  Paris Volley
 2000–01:  SC Espinho
 2001–02:  Knack Roeselare
 2002–03:  Piet Zoomers Apeldoorn
 2003–04:  Lokomotiv Kharkiv
 2004–05:  Olympiacos Piraeus
 2005–06:  Copra Berni Piacenza

 2006–07:  Autocommerce Bled
 2007–08:  Roma Volley
 2008–09:  Lokomotiv Belgorod
 2009–10:  Bre Banca Lannutti Cuneo
 2010–11:  Sisley Treviso
 2011–12:  Dynamo Moscow
 2012–13:  Halkbank Ankara
 2013–14:  Paris Volley
 2014–15:  Dynamo Moscow
 2015–16:  Berlin Recycling Volleys 
 2016–17:  Tours VB
 2017–18:  Belogorie Belgorod
 2018–19:  Diatec Trentino
 2020–21:  Dynamo Moscow
 2021–22:  Vero Volley Monza

CEV Cup Winners' Cup

CEV Top Teams Cup

CEV Cup

Titles by club

Titles by country

References

External links
 Official Website – European Volleyball Confederation

 
European men's volleyball club competitions
European volleyball records and statistics
Recurring sporting events established in 1972
1972 establishments in Europe
Multi-national professional sports leagues